Sri Lanka joined the International Monetary Fund on August 29, 1950. Since June 1965, Sri Lanka has taken 16 loans from the IMF, with a total value of 3,586,000,000 SDR's. The most recent of these loans was agreed to in June 2016, with an agreed total of 1,070,780 SDR's, and 715,230,000 SDR's being withdrawn. Of this total, 715,230,000 SDR's remain outstanding.

2016-2019 IMF intervention 
In 2016, Sri Lanka began an adjustment program, supported under the Extended Fund Facility. The Extended Fund Facility supported agreement expired in June 2020. While foreign exchange reserve levels did recover from 2016 to 2019, reserves have declined sharply since the onset of the COVID-19 pandemic. Similarly, Sri Lanka's current account balance briefly improved, but as of 2022, returned to exhibiting a large deficit.

Constituency 
Sri Lanka is a part of a constituency with Bangladesh, Bhutan, and India. The representative of this constituency on the IMF executive board is Surjit Singh Bhalla. This constituency has 3.05% of the total voting power of the IMF. Individually, Sri Lanka has 7,247 total votes, or .15% of the total voting power of the IMF. Sri Lanka's current IMF quota is 578.6 million SDR's.

Article IV consultations 
The 2021 article IV consultation for Sri Lanka was published in March 2022. The consultation warned of a rising current account deficit, referring to Sri Lanka's foreign exchange reserve levels as "critically low".  Executive directors praised Sri Lanka's COVID-19 policy response and vaccination drive, but argued that Sri Lanka's public debt was unsustainable. The executive directors recommended an increase in the income tax rate and value added tax, among other fiscal policy reforms, and cost-recovery energy pricing. The report also raised concerns about rising inflation, arguing that a tighter monetary policy response would be necessary. Additionally, executive directors stressed the importance of long-term structural adjustments to increase female labor force participation, reduce youth unemployment, diversify the economy, and fight corruption.

2019-present economic and political crisis 
Amidst the country's current foreign exchange crisis, former Sri Lankan President Gotabaya Rajapaksa sought a $3 Billion loan from the IMF in April 2022. Opposition party leaders urged Rajapaksa to seek IMF assistance prior to April. The governor of the country's central bank, P Nandalal Weeresignhe, echoed this sentiment. Sri Lanka has also sought an additional $500 million line of credit from India, and began negotiating a credit line of $1.5 billion. Sri Lankan minister of finance Ali Sabry has stated "We are a netural country. We are a friend to all." In May 2022, Sri Lanka defaulted on its debt for the first time in the country's history.

Negotiations between the IMF and Sri Lanka regarding lending to resolve the balance of payments crisis are ongoing. As of July 18, 2022 acting president Ranil Wickremesignhe stated that negotiations were nearing conclusion.

Controversy 
Washington Post columnist Ishaan Tharoor argues that the decision of the Rajapaksa government to accept a $3 billion line of credit from China to facilitate repayment of existing debts was an important factor in the development of the current crisis. Tharoor argues that rather than focus on long-term debt restructuring that may have resolved Sri Lanka's balance of payments crisis, Sri Lanka opted to pursue easy credit, resulting in eventual failure to repay outstanding loans. The article identifies this line of credit as a part of a broader trend referred to as debt trap diplomacy.

References 

Economy of Sri Lanka
International Monetary Fund relations